Fatty's Plucky Pup is a 1915 American short comedy film directed by and starring Fatty Arbuckle. A print of the film survives.

Plot
Fatty plays a somewhat lazy young man who disrupts his mother's life by causing a fire by smoking in bed, then ruins laundry day by dropping it in the mud. He has two loves of his life, the girl next door Lizzie and his dog Luke. After showcasing his lack of talents helping his mother, he is able to save Luke from the dog catchers and express his love for Lizzie through a hole in the fence. In the second reel, Fatty, Lizzie, mom and Luke go to the amusement park, where Fatty is first outwitted by a couple of sharks but then retrieves his losses by pointing a fake gun at them. To exact revenge, they kidnap Lizzie with the help of the embittered dog catchers, and take her to an abandoned shack, where they tie her to a post with a gun attached to a timer pointed at her head. Plucky pup Luke follows the crooks, and is able to warn Fatty in time to perform the last-minute rescue, with the help of the Keystone Cops. In the closing shot Fatty, Lizzie and Luke embrace in a joint kiss (and lick).

Cast
 Roscoe 'Fatty' Arbuckle as Fatty
 Phyllis Allen as Fatty's mother
 Joe Bordeaux as Kennedy's partner
 Luke the Dog as Luke
 Edgar Kennedy as Shell game operator
 Hank Mann
 Josephine Stevens as Lizzie
 Al St. John as Dog catcher
 Ted Edwards as Hired Thug (uncredited)

See also
 List of American films of 1915
 Fatty Arbuckle filmography

References

External links
 
 
 

1915 films
1915 comedy films
1915 short films
Silent American comedy films
American black-and-white films
American silent short films
Films about dogs
Films directed by Roscoe Arbuckle
Films produced by Mack Sennett
Keystone Studios films
American comedy short films
1910s American films
1910s English-language films